Al Meiklejohn (June 18, 1923 – March 1, 2010) was an American politician who served in the Colorado Senate from 1977 to 1997.

He died on March 1, 2010, in Arvada, Colorado at age 86.

References

1923 births
2010 deaths
Republican Party Colorado state senators